Carol Ann Hovenkamp-Grow (born May 23, 1971) is a former beauty queen, model, actress, and television personality.

Hovenkamp was born in Little Rock, Arkansas. She won the Miss Kansas USA title in 1993 and went on to represent Kansas in the Miss USA 1994 pageant broadcast live from South Padre Island, Texas on February 11, 1994.  She became the fourth consecutive delegate from her state to make the top twelve in the pageant, with an average preliminary score that put her eighth.  Once the scores were leveled Grow placed twelve in the interview competition and eleventh in swimsuit and evening gown, which gave her an average score placing her eleventh overall.

After this, she modeled for Venus Swimwear for 14 years consecutively. She also hosted Co-Ed Training on ESPN2 and appeared regularly on body shaping. On E-Entertainment she was the host of Search Party and did several "Wild On" episodes as well as various guest appearances on television programs such as Baywatch and General Hospital. Grow Co-Hosted the E!'s 1999 Reality Series Search Party with Scott Lasky. She was also a sideline reporter for the XFL and on Robot Wars: Extreme Warriors.  She was ranked #80 on the Maxim Hot 100 Women of 2001.

References

External links 

Carol Grow Bio on TV.com

1971 births
Living people
Female models from Arkansas
Miss USA 1994 delegates
Actresses from Little Rock, Arkansas
20th-century American people
21st-century American women